Laurent Susini (born April 18, 1965) is a French molecular biologist; his research is in the area of cancer and the genetic basis of tumor reversion.

Career 
Laurent Susini started at the Centre d'Etude du Polymorphisme Humain (Fondation Jean Dausset-CEPH). He obtained his PhD in Human Genetics and Molecular Biology from University Paris VII  - Denis Diderot.

He contributed to the first physical map of the Human Genome at Genethon and at Genset Corporation as a member of 's team, collaborating with research teams from Caltech and the Los Alamos National Lab.

In the Lab of Prof. Moshe Oren at the Weizmann Institute of Science, he demonstrated that SIAH1 targets NUMB (gene), a protein involved in directing cell fate choices, for ubiquitin-mediated degradation. SIAH1 is a p53-inducible gene, active in the process of cell death and tumor suppression by a mechanism consisting of ubiquitination and proteasomal degradation of specific target proteins.

Approaching cancer research with a different angle, not asking why the normal cells become malignant, but rather from the patients expectations: how do my tumor cells quit their malignant status, and thus, revert?, Laurent Susini joined Molecular Engines Laboratories (M.E.L.), a biotech company with headquarters and laboratories located in Paris (France), in 2000, to develop a new generation of innovative drugs against cancer with Adam Telerman and Robert Amson.

By conducting differential gene expression and bio-informatics analyses on the tumor reversion cellular models, they identified more than 200 genes involved in the process of tumor reversion, and specifically TCTP (Translationally Controlled Tumor Protein / Translationally Controlled Tumour Protein ). This work led to potential drugs preventing, and managing cancer by inhibiting the expression of the gene tpt1/TCTP.

Laurent Susini moved to Oncology Clinical Research in 2007 to contribute in clinical early development of anti-cancer drugs. First with Quintiles and then joining the Translational Clinical Oncology department from the Novartis Institutes for BioMedical Research to design and conduct phase I clinical trials, mainly in melanoma and heme malignancies.

Research 
Laurent Susini has played a critical role in the research of M.E.L founded by Adam Telerman and Robert Amson. More particularly his expertise was instrumental for the genetic and epigenetic analyses of single revertant cells from different cancer cell lines, for the identification of a "drugable" target and for the generation of pharmacological compounds able to kill cancer cells.

TCTP (Translationally Controlled Tumor Protein was identified in a screen between tumor cells and revertant cells. Inhibition of TCTP influences reversion of tumor cells.
Therefore, the objective was to develop drugs targeting TCTP in cancers overexpressing the protein.

Translationally Controlled Tumor Protein (TCTP/tpt1) is a regulator of the tumor reversion program, tumor progression and certain forms of inflammatory diseases.
Laurent Susini described TCTP as a pro-survival protein antagonizing BAX, Bcl-2-associated X protein, function

Most cited publications  
 Chumakov, I.M., Rigault, P., Le Gall, I., Bellanne-Chantelot, C., Billault, A., Soularue, P., Belova, M., Sambucy, J-L., Susini, L., ... and Cohen, D. "A YAC contig map of the human genome. Nature 1995 Sep; 377(6547 Suppl):175-297. Cited 446 times according to Google Scholar 
 Susini L, et al. "Biological models and genes of tumor reversion: Cellular reprogramming through tpt1/TCTP and SIAH-1.  Proc Natl Acad Sci U S A 2002 Nov 12;99(23):14976-81. Cited 322 times according to Google Scholar
 Bellanne-Chantelot, C., Lacroix, B., Ougen, P., Billault, A., Beaufils, S., Bertrand, S., Georges, I., Glibert, F., Gros, I., Lucotte, G., Susini, L., ... and Cohen, D. Mapping the whole human genome by fingerprinting yeast artificial chromosomes. Cell. 1992 Sep 18;70(6):1059-68. Cited 248 times  according to Google Scholar 
 Marcel Tuynder, Giusy Fiucci, Sylvie Prieur, Alexandra Lespagnol, Anne Géant, Séverine Beaucourt, Dominique Duflaut, Stéphanie Besse, Laurent Susini, Jean Cavarelli, Dino Moras, Robert Amson,  and Adam Telerman.  "Translationally controlled tumor protein is a target of tumor reversion Proc Natl Acad Sci U S A. 2004 Oct 26;101(43):15364-9.  Cited 274 times according to Google Scholar 
  Cited 237 times according to Google Scholar

Patents 
 SCREENING METHOD BASED ON SIAH1-NUMB INTERACTION   Publication: DE60120220T - 2007-03-29
 Sequences involved in phenomena of tumor suppression, tumor reversion, apoptosis and/or virus resistance and their use as medicines.  Publication: US2005221303 -  2005-10-06
 Sequences involved in phenomena of tumor suppression, tumor reversion, apoptosis and/or virus resistance and their use as medicines. Publication: US2004241671 - 2004-12-02
 Compositions and methods for the treatment of cancers: Composition and methods of treating, preventing, and managing cancer by inhibiting the expression of the gene tpt1/TCTP. Publication: US2004087531 -  2004-05-06
 COMPOSITIONS AND METHODS FOR THE TREATMENT OF CANCER Publication: WO03097835 - 2003-11-27
 New human nucleic acid, useful for diagnosis, prognosis and treatment, e.g. of tumors, also related vectors, transformed cell, polypeptides and antibodies. Publication: FR2822475 - 2002-09-27

Genes 

 NUMB,
 SIAH1,
 TCTP,

References

External links 

http://www.tumor-reversion.org/

 
http://www.researchgate.net/profile/Laurent_Susini/
http://cvscience.aviesan.fr/cv/1553/laurent-susini
https://publons.com/researcher/2918046/laurent-susini/
https://orcid.org/0000-0002-5164-2770 
http://www.molecular-engines-laboratories.info/html/03-publications.html
CEPH – Official Site of the CEPH

1965 births
Living people
French biologists